Catathelasma is a genus of fungi in the family Biannulariaceae. Basidiocarps (fruit bodies) are agaricoid, with a conspicuous veil (leaving a double ring on the stem), adnate to decurrent lamellae, and amyloid basidiospores. The genus is separated on DNA characteristics as well as morphology. Species are known from North America, Europe, and Asia and are ectomycorrhizal, forming an association with the living roots of trees.

Taxonomy
The genus Catathelasma was originally described in 1910 by American botanist and mycologist Ruth Ellen Harrison Lovejoy with C. evanescens as the type species.

in 1922 the Austrian botanist Günther Beck von Mannagetta und Lerchenau referred the European species Armillaria imperialis to his new genus Biannularia. For a time Catathelasma and Biannularia were regarded as separate (though closely related) genera, as for instance in a 1936 paper by Rolf Singer. Later Singer united the genera using Lovejoy's earlier name. Recent DNA research confirms this synonymy.

Etymology
 
Lovejoy's original description states that:

According to Genaust's etymological dictionary of botanical names, "Catathelasma" comes from Ancient Greek words "kata" ( - downwards) and "thelasma" ( - meaning "the act of suckling"). He says that the reason for this construction is unclear, but suggests that the author is comparing the shape made by the gills running down the stem with a teat stretched out during suckling.  "Decurrent" means "running down the stem" and another possible connection with Lovejoy's description is that "katatheo" means "I run down".  However it is difficult to see how that could logically give rise to the noun "Catathelasma".

Description

Catathelasma species are stocky, Tricholoma-like fungi, with adnate to decurrent lamellae (gills), a double veil (giving the stipe two rings), a stipe that is tapered to the base and rooting (often buried), and a mealy smell. At the microscopic level they have oblong to cylindrical, amyloid spores, a bilateral gill trama, and hyphae with clamp connections.

Habitat and distribution

Species are ectomycorrhizal, growing on the ground under conifers. They are known from continental Europe, North and Central America, and Asia.

Edibility
Some species of Catathelasma are edible and are collected for food in China, Guatemala, and Russia.

References

Agaricales genera